The Ambassador of the Philippines to Turkey is an officer of the Philippine Department of Foreign Affairs and the head of the Embassy of the Philippines to the Republic of Turkey. The position has the rank and status of an Ambassador Extraordinary and Plenipotentiary.

Prior to the post's formation in October 1991, the Philippines and Turkey have exchanged their ambassadors through non-resident embassies. In 1990, the Turkish government established a resident embassy in Manila, and one year later, the Philippine government also established its resident embassy in Ankara.

List of representatives

See also
 Foreign relations of the Philippines
 Foreign relations of Turkey

References

External links
 Official website of Embassy of the Philippines, Ankara

Turkey
Philippines